The American Southwest Conference (ASC) is a college athletic conference, founded in 1996, whose member schools compete in the NCAA's Division III.  The schools are located in Texas and Arkansas. The conference competes in baseball, men's and women's basketball, men's and women's cross country, football, men's and women's golf, men's and women's soccer, softball, men's and women's tennis, men's and women's track and field, and women's volleyball.

The American Southwest Conference operates from the same headquarters complex in the Dallas suburb of Richardson as the NCAA Division II Lone Star Conference.

History

The American Southwest Conference was announced in May 1996. The new league included some former members of the Texas Intercollegiate Athletic Association (TIAA). Founding members of the ASC were Howard Payne University, Austin College, Hardin–Simmons University, McMurry University, Mississippi College, Sul Ross State University, the University of Dallas and the University of the Ozarks.

The expansion soon began as the University of Mary Hardin–Baylor joined the ASC in 1997; followed by East Texas Baptist University, LeTourneau University, Schreiner University and the University of Texas at Dallas in 1998; then Concordia University Texas in 1999, and finally Louisiana Christian University, then known as Louisiana College, and Texas Lutheran University in 2000.

The University of Dallas was a member of the ASC until the end of the 2000–01 season to become a Independent; and Austin College withdrew the ASC in the 2005–06 season to join the Southern Collegiate Athletic Conference (SCAC). The University of Texas at Tyler began athletics in 2002 and became a member in 2003, but as a provisional member of the NCAA, was ineligible to participate in ASC or NCAA postseason tournaments until 2007. Centenary College of Louisiana joined the conference in 2011, after completing their transition from Division I to Division III, but almost immediately announced its departure for the Southern Collegiate Athletic Conference.

Recently, however, several schools have announced plans to leave the conference in favor of the Southern Collegiate Athletic Conference, which lost seven of its members at the end of the 2011–12 school year. Centenary departed at the end of the 2011–12 season after joining the ASC in that same season; Schreiner and Texas Lutheran left at the end of the 2012–13 season.

In 2012, McMurry left the ASC and completed the process of reclassifying to a full-scholarship, Division II institution and joined the Heartland Conference. Additionally, Mississippi College announced that it would be also leaving the conference and reclassifying to Division II in 2014. Mississippi College will re-join the Gulf South Conference, a league that it had been a member of until 1996.

The departures of McMurry, Texas Lutheran and Mississippi College will leave the conference with only six football playing members, below the minimum seven participating schools required to receive an automatic bid to the NCAA football playoffs. The conference has not announced a plan to maintain its automatic bid.

ASC officials announced on March 13, 2014, the forthcoming addition of McMurry University and Belhaven University to its membership. McMurry will re-join the ASC after a two-year stint in the Division II level, competing as a member of the Heartland Conference; while Belhaven is scheduled to join the ASC as a provisional member in 2015.

On December 3, 2015, ASC officials reported that Texas Lutheran University and Southwestern University would join the conference for football in 2017  as football-only members. Both schools are members of the Southern Collegiate Athletic Conference, but the conference only had four remaining schools competing in football. Two other SCAC schools. Austin College and Trinity University (Texas), announced they would play football in the Southern Athletic Association beginning with the 2017 season. The SCAC dropped football as a conference sport after the 2016 season.

In July 2018, the NCAA approved UT Tyler's application to begin a transition to NCAA Division II effective with the 2019–20 school year. Accordingly, UT Tyler left the ASC at the end of the 2018–19 school year. While the school did not immediately announce its future affiliation, it stated that it expected to join the Lone Star Conference. The following month, UT Tyler was officially unveiled as an incoming LSC member.

In July 2020, Louisiana College announced that it would leave the NCAA and applied to rejoin the National Association of Intercollegiate Athletics after the 2020–21 school year.

The most recent changes in the ASC membership were announced on August 13, 2020, when Austin reported it would return to the conference as a football-only affiliate beginning with the 2021 season, committing to at least four years as an affiliate, then on August 19, 2021, Southwestern University announced its football program will move to the Southern Athletic Association (SAA) to start the 2023 season as an affiliate member. and on November 26, 2021, when the USA South Athletic Conference initially named Belhaven as its newest member in the 2022–23 academic year. However, on February 18, 2022, Belhaven was announced as an inaugural member of the new Collegiate Conference of the South (CCS) following a geographical split in the USA South, where the Blazers will remain as football associate members.

On November 1, 2022, McMurry University announced that it will leave the ASC in the fall of 2024 to join the Southern Collegiate Athletic Conference. While on February 1, 2023, Sul Ross State University announced that it will leave the ASC in the fall of 2024 to join the Lone Star Conference if approved to move up to Division II status.

Chronological timeline
 1996 - In May 1996, the American Southwest Conference (ASC) was founded. Charter members included Austin College, Hardin–Simmons University, Howard Payne University, McMurry University, Mississippi College, Sul Ross State University, the University of Dallas and the University of the Ozarks, effective beginning the 1996–97 academic year.
 1997 - The University of Mary Hardin–Baylor joined the ASC, effective in the 1997–98 academic year.
 1998
 East Texas Baptist University, LeTourneau University, Schreiner University and the University of Texas at Dallas joined the ASC, effective in the 1998–99 academic year.
 Also at that time, Texas Lutheran University joined the ASC as an affiliate member for football.
 1999 - Concordia University Texas joined the ASC, effective in the 1999–2000 academic year.
 2000 - Louisiana College (now Louisiana Christian University) joined the ASC, along with Texas Lutheran upgrading to full membership for all sports, effective in the 2000–01 academic year.
 2001 - U. of Dallas left the ASC to become a Division III Independent, effective after the 2000–01 academic year.
 2003 - The University of Texas at Tyler joined the ASC, effective in the 2003–04 academic year.
 2006 - Austin College left the ASC to join the Southern Collegiate Athletic Conference (SCAC), effective after the 2005–06 academic year.
 2011 - Centenary College of Louisiana joined the ASC, effective in the 2011–12 academic year.
 2012 - Two institutions left the ASC to join their respective new home primary conferences: Centenary (La.) to join the SCAC, and McMurry to join the Division II ranks of the National Collegiate Athletic Association (NCAA) and the Heartland Conference, both effective after the 2011–12 academic year.
 2013
 Schreiner and Texas Lutheran left the ASC to join the SCAC, effective after the 2012–13 academic year.
 The University of California, Santa Cruz (UC Santa Cruz or UCSC) joined the ASC as an associate member for women's golf, effective in the 2014 spring season (2013-14 academic year).
 2014
 Mississippi College left the ASC to reclassify in the NCAA Division II ranks and the Gulf South Conference (GSC), effective after the 2013–14 academic year.
 McMurry re-joined back to the ASC (therefore it withdrew from Division II to return to Division III), effective in the 2014–15 academic year.
 2015 - Belhaven University joined the ASC, effective in the 2015–16 academic year.
 2017 - Southwestern University joined the ASC as an associate member for football (with Texas Lutheran re-joining back for football), effective in the 2017 fall season (2017-18 academic year).
 2019 - UT Tyler left the ASC to join the NCAA Division II ranks and the Lone Star Conference (LSC), effective after the 2018–19 academic year.
 2021
 Louisiana College left the ASC to join the National Association of Intercollegiate Athletics (NAIA) and the Red River Athletic Conference (RRAC), effective after the 2020–21 academic year.
 Austin College returned to the ASC as an associate member for football, effective in the 2021 fall season (2021-22 academic year).
 2022
 Belhaven left the ASC to join the USA South Athletic Conference as an affiliate member for football, effective in the 2022–23 academic year. It was initially slated to join the USA South for all sports, but before this move took effect, the USA South amicably split into two conferences. Belhaven instead became a full member of the newly formed Collegiate Conference of the South (CCS).
 Southwestern (Tex.) will leave the ASC as an associate member for football to join the Southern Athletic Association (SAA) for that sport, effective after the 2022 fall season (2022–23) academic year.
 McMurry will leave the ASC to join the SCAC, effective with the 2024–25 academic year.
 2023 - Sul Ross State will leave the ASC to join the LSC (if approved to move up to NCAA Division II status), effective with the 2024–25 academic year.

Member schools

Current members
The ASC currently has 10 full members, all but two are private schools:

Notes

Affiliate members
The ASC currently has four affiliate members, all but one are private schools. The University of California, Santa Cruz (UC Santa Cruz) joined the conference as an affiliate member in women's golf in 2013. Southwestern University and Texas Lutheran University joined as affiliate members in football in 2017.  Austin College joins as an affiliate member in football in 2021.

Notes

Former members
The ASC had eight former full members, all but one were private schools:

Notes

Membership timeline

Sports

Men's sponsored sports by school

Men's varsity sports not sponsored by the ASC that are played by ASC schools

Women's sponsored sports by school

Women's varsity sports not sponsored by the ASC that are played by ASC schools

References

External links
 

 
College sports in Arkansas
College sports in Louisiana
College sports in Mississippi
College sports in Texas
Articles which contain graphical timelines